Salahuddin Panhwar (born 9 August 1966) is a Pakistani jurist and has been Justice of the Sindh High Court since 27 June 2012.

References

1966 births
Living people
Judges of the Sindh High Court
Pakistani judges